Frank Felix is a bass guitar player, from London, England.

He is credited with working with the following: Snake Davis, Peter White, Light of the World, Gabrielle, Lonnie Liston Smith, Acoustic Alchemy, Dave Koz, Nelly Furtado, Jim Diamond, Ronnie Laws, Heatwave (band), Mica Paris, Fatboy Slim, Jeff Kashiwa and Tony Hadley.

After seven years with the successful contemporary jazz group Acoustic Alchemy, Felix left the band to pursue a solo career. His first album, Funky Underground: Vol 1 was released in 2007.

References

External links
Frank Felix home page

Year of birth missing (living people)
Living people
English bass guitarists
English male guitarists
Male bass guitarists
Acoustic Alchemy members
Musicians from London